Sal Esquivel (born May 19, 1948) is an American businessman, real estate broker and politician from Oregon. Esquivel is a former Republican member of Oregon House of Representatives and senator.

Early life 
Esquivel was born in Pittsburg, California and was raised in Medford, graduating from Medford High School in 1966.

Education 
Esquivel attended Southern Oregon College.

Career 
In military, Esquivel joined the United States Navy and served in the Vietnam War from 1969 to 1970.

After serving the military, Esquivel worked in the wood products industry in Medford, Oregon.

In 1982, Esquivel started Western States Parts and Equipment, a heavy equipment and parts distributor. Esquivel is a real estate broker.

Esquivel served on the Medford City Council until 2004, when he was appointed to the Oregon State Senate to complete the term of Lenn Hannon, who resigned to take a position on the Oregon state parole board. Later that year, Esquivel ran for and won an open seat Oregon House of Representatives. He has been re-elected four times.

In 2017, Esquivel co-sponsored House Bill 3328 along with Rep. Paul Evans that would strip veterans and disable veterans of their civil service preference upon ten years of being discharged from the military. The proposed bill did not take into consideration veterans using education benefit such as 38 U.S.C Ch. 30 or 33 GI Bills, or Vocational Rehabilitation 38 U.S.C Ch. 31. As of the close of the 2017 session the bill did not leave committee.

Personal life 
Esquivel's wife is Jan Esquivel. They have five children. Esquivel and his family live in Medford, Oregon.

References

External links
 Legislative website
 Esquivel and Associates, LLC
 Sal Esquivel at ballotpedia.org
 Esquivel, Sal at ourcampaigns.com

Republican Party members of the Oregon House of Representatives
Republican Party Oregon state senators
People from Pittsburg, California
Politicians from Medford, Oregon
Living people
United States Navy sailors
1948 births
Oregon city council members
Southern Oregon University alumni
North Medford High School alumni
21st-century American politicians
Hispanic and Latino American state legislators in Oregon